A torero is the central bullfighter who must kill the bull.

Torero may also refer to:

In arts and literature
 "¡Torero!",  a 1956 Mexican documentary film directed by Carlos Velo about Mexican bullfighter Luis Procuna.
 "Torero",  a Latin pop/dance song written by Estéfano and Marcello Azevedo and performed by Puerto Rican singer Chayanne.

Other
 Torero Stadium, a 6,000-seat stadium in San Diego, California.